Kunlun Pass is mountain pass located 59 kilometers northeast of Nanning, Guangxi and traversed by . The altitude is around 300 m (1000 ft).

During the Second Sino-Japanese War, this pass was contended between the Japanese and the Chinese in the Battle of Kunlun Pass.

In 1939, a heavy battle between Chinese and Japanese forces broke out at Kunlun Pass, with both sides engaging their respective elite forces and best firearms.  The battle bore strong significance in the direction of the war because it might result in the total control of China by Japan or the safety of its material supply chain by China. Before the battle, China had been routed by Japan and withdrawn its military forces and civilians from the very north southwards, as well as had its capital city Nanjing falling into the hands of Japanese. China would not have afforded the loss again, it must win at any cost and that led to the heavy loss of lives in this battle of both sides. After the victory, the Chinese government set up memorial stones at the very site to mark the great honors of the bravery of both armed forces and the local civilians who had offered help during the fighting. After the rule of communist party, the site was scrapped but the local people who cherished the patriotism of the forces preserved the historical site at their cost and trouble.  Now with the gradual peace making between Beijing and Taipei, China reestablishes the memorial site and facilities are provided there to make the former battlefield a base for patriotism education.

There is an unrelated Kunlun Pass, at a much higher altitude, .
 

Mountain passes of China
Landforms of Guangxi
Major National Historical and Cultural Sites in Guangxi